Julián López González (born 10 November 1978) is a Spanish comedian and actor. He became popular for appearances in sketch comedy shows such as La hora chanante and Muchachada Nui.

Biography 
Julián López González was born in El Provencio, province of Cuenca, on 10 November 1978. He studied a degree in teaching (specialised in musical education) from the University of Castilla–La Mancha. He earned public recognition in 2002 with the sketch show La hora chanante (2002–2006), alongside Ernesto Sevilla and Joaquín Reyes, on Noche hache on Cuatro and later with Muchachada Nui (2007–2010). He made his feature film debut in Borja Cobeaga's 2009 comedy film Friend Zone.

He hosted the 5th Feroz Awards in 2018.

He has been a committed supporter of the football team Athletic Bilbao since childhood after receiving their kit as a present.

Filmography 

Film

Television

Awards and nominations 

|-
| align = "center" | 2012 || 67th CEC Medals || Best Supporting Actor || No controles ||  || 
|-
| align = "center" | 2019 || 5th  || Best Comedy Actor || Justo antes de Cristo ||  || 
|}

References 

1978 births
21st-century Spanish male actors
Spanish male television actors
Spanish male film actors
Spanish comedians
People from the Province of Cuenca
Living people
University of Castilla–La Mancha alumni
Male actors from Castilla–La Mancha